Dose is the second studio album by American rock band Gov't Mule. It was released on February 24, 1998, by Capricorn Records and (on vinyl) by Evil Teen Records. It was produced, recorded and mixed by Michael Barbiero and is a much darker record than Gov't Mule's self-titled debut album. The songs "Thelonius Beck" and "Birth of the Mule" were tributes to jazz musicians Thelonious Monk and Miles Davis, respectively, whereas the subtitle "Beck" refers to Jeff Beck, who also recorded a song named "Thelonius".

Track listing 
All songs by Warren Haynes unless otherwise noted.

The bonus track appears on the limited edition vinyl version released by Evil Teen Records. It's an acoustic version recorded at Outback Lodge, Charlottesville, in May 1998.

Personnel 
 Warren Haynes – vocals, guitar, percussion
 Matt Abts – drums, percussion
 Allen Woody – bass, mandolin
 Michael Barbiero – production, tambourine on "John the Revelator"

References

Gov't Mule albums
1998 albums
Capricorn Records albums